James A. McDougall (1817–1867) was a U.S. Senator from California from 1861 to 1867. Senator McDougall may also refer to:

Alexander McDougall (1732–1786), New York State Senate
John E. McDougall (1860–1932), South Dakota State Senate

See also
Ryan McDougle (born 1971), Virginia State Senate